Octasphales niphadosticha is a moth in the family Depressariidae. It was described by Edward Meyrick in 1930. It is found in New Guinea.

The wingspan is about 17 mm. The forewings are grey, darker on the veins, strewn throughout with numerous white dots forming a longitudinal series, posteriorly on the veins. The costal edge is white between the antemedian scale-projection and the cilia. The hindwings are grey.

References

Moths described in 1930
Octasphales